Dark Sunset is a Malaysian-Singaporean television drama series and the 24th co-production of MediaCorp TV and ntv7. It is also the fourth production by MediaCorp Studios Malaysia Sdn Bhd. It was aired on ntv7 from 17 November 2011 to 9 January 2012. In Singapore, it is expected to be broadcast in 2013.

Synopsis
This drama is based on real police cases. A mysterious death has taken place in a wealthy family. Ye Tingting is sent by the CID to investigate the cause of Lin Zhicai's death besides gathering evidence to charge Lin Wenfu for his illegal activities. While the Lin family appear like the dream wealthy family, dark secrets lurk within the four walls of their mansion, many dating back some thirty years.

When Lin Wenfu was a child, his father Lin Maogen was suspected of killing his four friends and business partners to pocket their profits. No bodies or evidence was found indicating that Lin Maogen was the killer and he vehemently denied any part in it. One of the men Ou Laifu's wife cursed him, saying that the Lin family line will end at Wenfu's son. The pregnant Mrs Ou hung herself at the gate of the Lins' house and Lin Maogen later died of a terrible mysterious illness.

At present, the Lin family has been receiving death threats after Zhicai's death was reported in the news. Kexin's dog is killed and its corpse sent to their house. Some "supernatural" incidents take place in the house. Then, tragedy befalls Lin Wenfu's own men one by one.  Rumours indicate that perhaps "the curse" is at work again. A mysterious woman keeps turning up at the Lins' house to curse them and tell Wenfu's assistant Qiu Jiawei that "he has forgotten his roots". As time passes, Tingting realises that there is more to this "curse" than meets the eye and is determined to find the truth before someone else gets to it first.

Cast and characters

Lin family

References

External links
Dark Sunset on ntv7

Chinese-language drama television series in Malaysia
2011 Malaysian television series debuts
2012 Malaysian television series endings
2011 Singaporean television series debuts
2012 Singaporean television series endings
NTV7 original programming
Channel 8 (Singapore) original programming